Indian Lake Airport  is a privately owned, closed airport located in Indian Lake, Pennsylvania, United States.

The airport was constructed in 1966 to serve the growing community of Indian Lake. By 1975, the northwest-southeast runway, 14/32, had been added. The original runway was abandoned by 1993, and the entire airport was closed in 1999. As of 2006, the airport was listed for sale for US$7,000,000.

Accidents
According to FAA records, there has been only one fatal accident involving Indian Lake Airport.  On June 13, 1968, a student pilot attempting to land in instrument meteorological conditions crashed north of the airport.  The NTSB concluded that the pilot had attempted operation beyond his ability level and experienced spatial disorientation.

References

Airports in Pennsylvania
Defunct airports in Pennsylvania
Transportation buildings and structures in Somerset County, Pennsylvania